Umid or UMID or Ümid may refer to:

 Unique Material Identifier, for labelling media files etc.
 Unified Multi-Purpose ID, Philippines, an identity card 
 Umid gas field off the Azerbaijani coast
 Ümid FK, an Azerbaijani football club

People
 Umid Irgashev (born 1987), Uzbek TV and film actor
 Umid Iskandarov (born 1980), Uzbek actor and director
 Umid Isoqov (born 1978), Uzbek footballer
 Omid (name), sometimes transliterated as Umid